Victoria Dergunova (born 27 December 1995) is a Russian badminton player.

Achievements

European Junior Championships
Girls' Doubles

BWF International Challenge/Series
Women's Doubles

 BWF International Challenge tournament
 BWF International Series tournament
 BWF Future Series tournament

References

External links
 

1995 births
Living people
Russian female badminton players
21st-century Russian women